Mohammad Harun ar Rashid is a Jatiya Party (Ershad) politician and the former Member of Parliament of Dhaka-8.

Career
Rashid was elected to parliament from Dhaka-8 as a Jatiya Party candidate in 1986.

References

Jatiya Party politicians
Living people
3rd Jatiya Sangsad members
Year of birth missing (living people)